Carla Camurati (born October 14, 1960) is a Brazilian actress and filmmaker. She became notorious for acting in several Rede Globo telenovelas in the 1980s. She also acted on children's theater, starred in films—including Eternamente Pagú for which she won the Best Actress Award of Festival de Gramado—and was cover of the Brazilian edition of Playboy. In 1995, she debuted as a director with Carlota Joaquina, Princess of Brazil, an important mark in the period of Cinema of Brazil known as "Retomada". She was the director of Fundação Theatro Municipal do Rio de Janeiro that administers the Teatro Municipal from 2007 to 2014.

Selected filmography
Champagne (1983; actress)
Eternamente Pagú (1986; actress)
Fera Radical (1988; actress)
Brasileiras e Brasileiros (1990; actress)
Carlota Joaquina, Princess of Brazil (1995; director, actress)

References

External links

1960 births
Living people
Actresses from Rio de Janeiro (city)
Brazilian film actresses
Brazilian television actresses
Brazilian women film directors